The Division of Swan is an Australian electoral division located in Western Australia.

Swan is a marginal electorate that has swung between both major political parties in the past two decades. It extends across the Swan River from central Perth, and covers most of the area between the Swan and Canning Rivers. 

The seat includes a mix of incomes and housing types, from low-price flats to affluent suburbs with Swan River views. The electorate includes the campus of Curtin University, the Welshpool and Kewdale industrial areas, and Perth Airport. Swan covers 151 sq. kilometers.

The current MP is Zaneta Mascarenhas, a member of the Australian Labor Party. She was elected in the 2022 election.

History

The division is named after the Swan River. For several decades, it has been a marginal seat, extending along the Swan and Canning Rivers from the affluent suburbs in the City of South Perth to the west, which typically vote for the Liberal Party, to the City of Belmont to the east and parts of the City of Canning to the south-east, which are more working-class in orientation and typically vote for the Labor Party. A redistribution ahead of the 2010 election added the strongly Labor-voting suburb of Langford, which was previously within Tangney, which made it a notionally Labor seat. Langford was redistributed to Burt in 2016.

The division was one of the original 65 divisions contested at the first federal election. Historically, the electorate was a country seat extending north to Dongara, east to Merredin and south to the coast. It contracted to an area east of the Darling Range and became a safe Country Party seat. Prior to the 1949 election, its old area became the new seat of Moore, while Swan moved into approximately its present position, although initially extending as far north-east as Midland.

From 2004 to 2007 it was the third most marginal electorate in Australia, after Hindmarsh and Kingston, with the ALP incumbent Kim Wilkie winning 50.08 percent of the two-party-preferred vote in 2004.

At the 2007 election, Liberal candidate Steve Irons won the seat with a swing of 0.19 percent.  Irons was the only Coalition challenger to unseat a Labor incumbent at the 2007 election.  However, the election came at a very bad time for the state Labor government, which was only polling at 49 percent support at the time the writs were dropped. Irons was re-elected with a slightly increased majority in 2010, making it a fairly safe Liberal seat. Following the 2016 election Labor candidate Tammy Solonec managed to return Swan to marginal status.

Steve Irons retained the seat in the 2019 election. Hannah Beazley contested the seat for Labor but ultimately conceded defeat. After Steve Iron's retirement at the 2022 Australian federal election, the seat was contested by Kristy McSweeney from the Liberal Party. She was defeated by Zaneta Mascarenhas from the Labor Party.

Geography
Since 1984, federal electoral division boundaries in Australia have been determined at redistributions by a redistribution committee appointed by the Australian Electoral Commission. Redistributions occur for the boundaries of divisions in a particular state, and they occur every seven years, or sooner if a state's representation entitlement changes or when divisions of a state are malapportioned.

In August 2021, the Australian Electoral Commission (AEC) announced that Swan would lose the suburb of Wilson to the seat of Tangney and gain the suburbs of Maida Vale and Wattle Grove and the remainder of Forrestfield and High Wycombe from the seat of Hasluck. These boundary changes took place as of the 2022 election.

Swan is bordered by the Swan River in the north and west, the Canning River and the City of Canning in the south, and Roe Highway, Great Eastern Highway and Perth Airport in the east. Suburbs include:

City of Belmont: 

 Ascot
 Belmont
 Cloverdale
 Kewdale
 Perth Airport
 Redcliffe
 Rivervale

City of Canning: 

 Bentley
 Cannington
 East Cannington
 Queens Park
 St James
 Welshpool

City of Kalamunda: 

 Forrestfield
 High Wycombe
 Maida Vale
 Wattle Grove

City of South Perth: 

 Como
 Karawara
 Kensington
 Manning
 Salter Point
 South Perth
 Waterford

City of Swan: 

 South Guildford (part)

Town of Victoria Park: 

 Burswood
 Carlisle
 Lathlain
 East Victoria Park
 St James
 Victoria Park

Members

Election results

References

External links
 Division of Swan - Australian Electoral Commission

Electoral divisions of Australia
Constituencies established in 1901
1901 establishments in Australia
Federal politics in Western Australia